Petham is a rural village and civil parish in the North Downs, five miles south of Canterbury in Kent, South East England.

The village church is All Saints, Petham and is Grade I listed. It was built in the 13th century but suffered from a fire in 1922 and had to be reconstructed. The village hall was rebuilt in the early 21st century next to Marble pond on relatively low meadows deemed unsuitable for housing and insurance.

Petham has rolling hills within its bounds, including ancient forested slopes and thatched medieval and Tudor period cottages.

It now incorporates Swarling to the north, which had "33.5" households in the Domesday Book, and is one of the type sites for British Iron Age Aylesford-Swarling pottery.  The excavation, by J. P. Bushe-Fox, to publication took place in 1921–1925.

History
Similar to other comparable villages, Petham once featured multiple facilities such as a baker, cobbler, post office and garage. Today, none of these facilities remains and the only public buildings are the Petham Pint, a small tavern that was opened during COVID times to try and increase morale, and the All Saints church and graveyard. This decline began in the 1940s and can be attributed to increasing household car ownership (in the early 1940s 90% of households did not own a car). Increasing car ownership allowed easier travel between Petham and Canterbury, enabling residents to access services in the city.

Gallery

References

External links

Civil parishes in Kent
Villages in Kent
City of Canterbury